Mellow Mark, (May 23, 1974 in Reutlingen, Germany) real name Mark Schlumberger, is a rap, reggae and soul musician.

Bio
Mellow Mark grew up in Bayreuth and started his musical career in the early 1990s with the band Loewenherz. After several setbacks with this project, he adopted the name "Mellow Mark" and returned to his street musician roots.

In 2003, Mellow Mark received the ECHO Best National Newcomer award and in 2005 he received the Reggae Awards Album of the Year award for his album Das 5te Element (The Fifth Element).

Discography

Albums
 2003: Sturm
 2004: Das 5te Element
 2007: Metropolis
 2009: Ratz Fatz Peng
 2013: L.I.E.B.E (Live)
 2015: Roots & Flugel
 2017: Nomade

EPs
 2002: Revolution

7 inch
 2003: Dein Wort in Gottes Ohr feat. Pyro
 2004: Was geht ab mit der Liebe

12 inch
 2003: Feuer/Hunger
 2002: Revolution Mixes
 2003: Weltweit

Maxi-Singles
 2003: Dein Wort In Gottes Ohr feat. Pyro
 2003: Weltweit
 2003: Butterfly
 2004: Konsum feat. Cashma Hoody
 2005: Ay Muchacho feat. MassiveSound & Pyro
 2005: Comeback feat. Culcha Candela & Martin Jondo
 2006: Astronaut
 2007: Metropolis
 2008: Winter
 2008: YeahYeahYeah
 2012: Maine Stadt feat. Tanzkinder

References

External links
Official site

People from Bayreuth
Living people
Participants in the Bundesvision Song Contest
Year of birth missing (living people)